The 22nd International Indian Film Academy Awards, also known as the IIFA, was held on 3–4 June 2022, postponed from the original 18–19 March 2022 date, and the 19–21 May 2022 date. Furthermore, it was supposed to be held in 2021, before being postponed a year, along with the 2020 (2021) edition. The awards was held in Abu Dhabi, United Arab Emirates. The nominees were announced in early 2022.

Shershaah led the ceremony with 13 nominations, followed by 83 with 10 nominations and Atrangi Re with 7 nominations.

Shershaah won 6 awards, including Best Film and Best Director (for Vishnuvardhan), thus becoming the most-awarded film at the ceremony.

Pankaj Tripathi received dual nominations for Best Supporting Actor for his performances in 83 and Ludo, winning for the latter.

Background 
The awards began in 2000 and the first ceremony was held in London at The Millennium Dome. From then on the awards were held at locations around the world signifying the international success of Bollywood. The 22nd IIFA Awards was supposed to be held in 2021 & 18-19 March 2022 but was postponed to 19-21 May 2022 date due to the surge in COVID-19 cases, it was again postponed to 3–4 June 2022 due to the demise of UAE President & Ruler of Abu Dhabi Sheikh Khalifa bin Zayed Al Nahyan. The IIFA ceremony held in UAE after 16 years (2006) which was held in Dubai.

Awards 

The winners and nominees have been listed below. Winners are listed first, highlighted in boldface, and indicated with a double dagger.

Popular Awards

Technical Awards

Superlatives

References

External links

International Indian Film Academy Awards
IIFA awards